Vendhampatti Azhagappan is an Indian film director and screenwriter who has worked on Tamil films. He rose to fame after making the romantic drama film Aagaya Thamaraigal (1985) featuring Suresh and Revathi and has continued to make films in a similar genre.

Career 
During his career Azhagappan regularly collaborated with actor Ramarajan, as well as Suresh. His final release, Poomaname Vaa (1999) was produced under the banner of Nalini Cine Arts by Ramarajan's wife Nalini Ramarajan. During production, the film was labelled as the actor's 40th film and 11th film as a director, but V. Azhagappan was later given the post. The initial cast included other actors such as Chandrasekhar, Manorama and Santhana Bharathi, who eventually did not feature.

Filmography 
Director

References

External links 

Living people
20th-century Indian film directors
Tamil film directors
Male actors in Tamil cinema
Year of birth missing (living people)
Place of birth missing (living people)